The 2018 Liga 3 Riau Island is a qualifying round for the national round of 2018 Liga 3. PS Bintan, the winner of the 2017 Liga 3 Riau Islands are the defending champions. The competition will begin on August 2, 2018.

Group stage 
The 6 probable teams to compete are mentioned below.
This stage scheduled starts on 02 August 2018.

Group A

Group B

Knockout stage

References 

 

Liga Nusantara
3